Caryocolum paghmanum is a moth of the family Gelechiidae. It is found in Afghanistan.

The length of the forewings is 5.5–6 mm for males and 6 mm for females. The forewings are cream with indistinct dark brown markings frequently mottled with cream scales. Adults have been recorded on wing from the end of July to early August.

References

Moths described in 1988
paghmanum
Moths of Asia